Motandra guineensis grows as a climbing shrub or liana up to  long, with a stem diameter of up to . Its fragrant flowers feature a white to greenish white corolla. M. guineensis is found in a variety of habitats from sea-level to  altitude. In local traditional medicine, it is used for eye infections, toothache, headache and postpartum stomach pain. The plant is found in Guinea, Mali, Sierra Leone, Liberia, Ivory Coast, Ghana, Togo, Benin, Nigeria, Sudan, Cameroon, the Central African Republic, Gabon, the Republic of Congo, the Democratic Republic of Congo, Burundi, Uganda and Angola.

References

guineensis
Plants described in 1844
Plants used in traditional African medicine
Flora of Africa